Clifton College Close is a cricket venue in Clifton College, Bristol, which was used by Gloucestershire for 96 first-class matches between 1871 and 1932. It is first recorded as a cricket venue in 1860 and remains in use for local matches.

The Close witnessed 13 of W. G. Grace's first-class hundreds for Gloucestershire in the County Championship. Grace's children attended the college.

The Close featured in a well-known poem by O.C. Sir Henry Newbolt – Vitaї Lampada ("There's a breathless hush in the Close to-night")

References

Cricket grounds in Bristol
Sports venues completed in 1860
Clifton, Bristol